Puzzle Break is an escape room company headquartered in Seattle, Washington co-founded by Nate Martin and Lindsay Morse. It is the first American-based escape room company.

History

Puzzle Break's first escape room, Escape from Studio D, opened in the Capitol Hill neighborhood of Seattle, Washington in August 2013. In May 2014, operations expanded to San Francisco, California with the release of its second room, The Grimm Escape. Puzzle Break was named one of Seattle Magazine's Hidden Gems in June 2014. In November 2014, Escape from Studio D was closed to make way for Puzzle Break's next project: Escape from Twenty Thousand Leagues. Escape the Midnight Carnival followed in March 2016. The Eventide Departure and Escape the Lost Temple were added in 2017.

Rooms

Puzzle Break participants are locked in a room for one hour and must work together to find hidden clues, solve puzzles, and escape the room. Current locations include Seattle, Washington, Syosset, New York, and Newton, Massachusetts. Most rooms are designed for 6-12 players and the entire experience is approximately 90 minutes. The escape rate for all rooms fluctuates between 15 and 20%. Puzzle Break also offers off-site escape games where they travel to customers' locations.

Rooms offered:
 Escape from Starbase Alpha (off-site)
 The Grimm Escape
 A Hollywoodland Mystery (off-site, for up to 250 players).
 Escape from Twenty Thousand Leagues
 Escape the Midnight Carnival
 Escape from the Future (aboard Anthem of the Seas & Ovation of the Seas)
 Escape the Rubicon (aboard Harmony of the Seas)
The Eventide Departure
Escape the Lost Temple

Partnership with Royal Caribbean

On March 31, 2015, Puzzle Break announced a partnership with Royal Caribbean International to produce Escape from the Future for the MS Anthem of the Seas, the first Escape Room on a cruise ship. Escape from the Future was later confirmed to be appearing on Ovation of the Seas.

On March 15, 2016, Royal Caribbean International announced a new Puzzle Break room, Escape the Rubicon, was under construction on the upcoming Harmony of the Seas. Additional construction was performed by ShowFX, Inc.

References

Escape rooms
2013 establishments in Washington (state)
Companies based in Seattle
American companies established in 2013